The Maranhão gubernatorial election of 1994 was held in the Brazilian state of Maranhão on October 3, alongside Brazil's general elections, with a second round on November 16. Liberal Front Party (PFL) candidate Roseana Sarney was elected on November 16, 1994.

References  

1994 Brazilian gubernatorial elections
October 1994 events in South America

1994